The men's high jump event at the 2014 World Junior Championships in Athletics was held in Eugene, Oregon, USA, at Hayward Field on 23 and 25 July.

Medalists

Records

Results

Final
25 July
Start time: 18:29  Temperature: 28 °C  Humidity: 33 %
End time: 20:35  Temperature: 25 °C  Humidity: 41 %

Qualifications
23 July
With qualifying standard of 2.19 (Q) or at least the 12 best performers (q) advance to the Final

Summary

Details
With qualifying standard of 2.19 (Q) or at least the 12 best performers (q) advance to the Final

Group A
25 July
Start time; 18:16  Temperature: 18 °C  Humidity: 64 %
End time: 19:18  Temperature: 18 °C  Humidity: 56 %

Group B
25 July
Start time; 18:14  Temperature: 18 °C  Humidity: 64 %
End time: 19:19  Temperature: 18 °C  Humidity: 56 %

Participation
According to an unofficial count, 26 athletes from 19 countries participated in the event.

Heats

References

External links
 WJC14 high jump schedule

High jump
High jump at the World Athletics U20 Championships